The Tufts University Sailing Team represents Tufts University in the intercollegiate sport of sailing. They are members of the Intercollegiate Sailing Association (ICSA), the governing body for collegiate sailing, and compete at the New England Intercollegiate Sailing Association (NEISA).

National championships 
The team holds 28 National Championships:
Dinghy Championships (5): 1976, 1980, 1981, 1997, 2001
Women's Dinghy National Championships (8): 1984, 1986, 1990, 1993, 1994, 1996, 1999, 2003
Team Racing National Championships (6): 1976 (with NEISA), 1984, 1993, 1994, 1995, 1996
Men's Single-handed National Championships (5): 1975, 1976, 1980, 1993, 1996 
Women's Single-handed National Championships (3): 1995, 1996, 1997 
Match Race (previously Sloop) National Championships (1): 2013

And received the Leonard M. Fowle Trophy in eight seasons: 1975, 1976, 1984, 1993, 1994, 1995, 1996, 1999

Sailors 
66 men and 25 women were All-Americans. 

Team members have received the ICSA College Sailor of the Year award 4 times:
Roger Altreuter in 1975
R. Stuart Johnstone in 1980
Paul Dickey in 1981
Senet Bischoff in 1996
And the ICSA Women's College Sailor of the Year once:
Kaitlin Storck in 2008

Olympians 
Carlos Echeverria in 1956; Peter Commette in 1976; Magnus Grävare in 1984; Mark Mendelblatt in 2004 and 2008; and Jen Provan in 2004 and 2008; are Olympic sailors from Tufts.

World champions 
Dave Curtis in 1976, 1978, 1981, 1982, 1983, 1985, 1992 (Etchells), 1967 (Jolly Boat), 1981 (Soling) and 1984 (J/24)
Elizabeth Gelenitis "Betsy" Allison in 1983 (Women’s Laser), 1987 (Lightning), 1987, 1991, 1993, 1995, 1997 (Women’s J/24), 1999 (Match Racing), 2003 (Yngling)
Bruce Burton in 1986, 1987 (Etchells)
Scott Kyle in 1986, 1990 (Sunfish)
Peter Comette in 1974 (Laser)
Nick Trotman in 1994 (505)
Tomas Hornos in 2007 (Snipe)
Brett Davis in 1998 (Team Racing)

Sailing venue
The home for the Tufts University sailing program is the Bacow Sailing Pavilion, named after Lawrence Bacow and his wife, Adele Fleet Bacow. It opened in the fall of 2013 and was built on the foundation of its 60-year-old predecessor, on Medford's Upper Mystic Lake.

Fleet
The fleet of Tufts University Sailing Team's includes 24 Larks and 6 FJs.

References

External links
 Website

Tufts University
Tufts Jumbos sailing